The New People is a 1969 American television series on ABC that focused on a group of young college students who were returning from a trip in Southeast Asia when their plane crashed on an island in the south Pacific Ocean. This program is an extremely rare example of a regularly scheduled network television series with 45-minute-long episodes; it aired immediately after The Music Scene, another 45-minute program.

Plot

The crash killed several of the college students, and all but one of the adults, who was badly injured and later died.  The surviving students were the only human life remaining on the island.  The island was unusual in that it had been built up as a site for a potential above-ground nuclear test which never took place, leaving all of the buildings and (improbably) supplies untouched and ready for use by the survivors. The trip to Southeast Asia was a goodwill tour arranged by the State Department showcasing what American youth were like, but it went awry when one of the students disrupted it, feeling that what they were doing was fake and a way to gloss over what was going on in the country and with relations to the Vietnam War.

The New People reflected the youth-oriented counterculture of the 1960s. All people over 30 were now dead, and it was up to the young people to start a new society on the island.  The pilot episode was written by Rod Serling, credited as "John Phillips."

Similar programs
The concept of having all the adults killed off leaving only the young people to survive was not a new one, nor was this to be its last appearance.  This concept had also been used in William Golding's 1954 novel and subsequent film, Lord of the Flies, and in the 27 October 1966 Star Trek episode "Miri".

In 2004 ABC premiered the hit series Lost which also featured a group of plane crash survivors stranded on a strange island. Producer Damon Lindelof later joked that if he had heard of the series, he would have used the name New People for the band of character Charlie Pace. In October 2005, NBC began broadcasting a Saturday morning series with a similar premise, Flight 29 Down.

Episodes

Original paperback novel tie-in
They Came from the Sea, an original tie-in novel based on the TV series was published in 1969 by Tempo Books, the young adult paperback imprint of Grosset & Dunlap. The author was the prolific tie-in specialist William Johnston, writing under the pseudonym "Alex Steele."

References

External links
 
 Television Obscurities – The New People

1969 American television series debuts
1970 American television series endings
1960s American drama television series
1970s American drama television series
American Broadcasting Company original programming
English-language television shows
Television series by CBS Studios
Television series created by Aaron Spelling
Television series created by Rod Serling
Television series set on fictional islands